Steen River is a settlement in northern Alberta within Mackenzie County, located on Highway 35,  north of High Level. There is a meteorite crater near the settlement called the Steen River crater. In June 2019, the Jackpot Creek Fire burned through the area, which included the settlement.

References

Localities in Mackenzie County